Sekar P. R. also known as Rudrapathy Sekar is a dubbing artist in the Southern Indian film industry. He has dubbed actors in the Tamil industry including Shahrukh Khan. He is a recipient of the Tamil Nadu State Film Award from the Government of Tamil Nadu.

Career
Sekar was born in a Tamil family. His father K. P. Rudrapathy worked under director A. P. Nagarajan. Sekar started his career dubbing for child artists. He made his debut with the straight Tamil film Pavithra (1994) lending his voice to actor Ajith Kumar's character, in his second venture. His major break was with the Baahubali (franchise) lending his voice to actor Prabhas for the Amarendra Baahubali character. He also dubbed Vivek Oberoi for a film Vivegam. His other major works include Kadhal Desam, Ullam Ketkumae and Payanam. He won the Tamil Nadu State Film Award for Best Male Dubbing Artist for Malarinum Melliya (2011). He mainly dubs in Tamil and dubs Telugu, Hindi and English films, including the Marvel Comics Universe films Deadpool (franchise), Ant-Man and the Wasp, X-Men: (franchise) for young Charles Xavier actor James McAvoy. He dubbed actor Ram Charan's blockbuster Telugu Film Maaveeran to Tamil voice.

He dubbed a  TV show in Tamil Kaun Banega Crorepati Season 2 by actor Sharukh Khan, the show telecast by Vijay TV. He has acted in a few Tamil films including Kodaikanal, Yennai Arindhaal, where he played police inspector and Adanga Maru.

Personal life
Sekar is married to Gayathri and has two sons- Akshanth Tej and Vilva.

Filmography

As actor

Dubbing roles

Tamil films

Tamil dubbed films

Tamil dubbed TV series

Dubbing Director 
Sekar has also scripted for different audiences (from other languages to Tamil). He has completed over 2000 movies, and 7000 hours of content for various movies and television

shows, both animated and live action. Shekar is known for his speciality to write for historical and mythological content like Jai Veera Hanuman (Jaya TV), Shirdi Sai Baba (Vijay TV), Ramayan (Sun TV), and Mahabharat (Doordarshan).

References

Living people
Year of birth missing (living people)
Indian voice actors
Indian Tamil people
Tamil male actors
Indian male voice actors
Male actors in Tamil cinema
Tamil Nadu State Film Awards winners
Male actors from Chennai